The coefficient of restitution (COR, also denoted by e), is the ratio of the final to initial relative speed between two objects after they collide.  It normally ranges from 0 to 1 where 1 would be a perfectly elastic collision. A perfectly inelastic collision has a coefficient of 0, but a 0 value does not have to be perfectly inelastic. It is measured in the Leeb rebound hardness test, expressed as 1000 times the COR, but it is only a valid COR for the test, not as a universal COR for the material being tested.

The value is almost always less than 1 due to initial translational kinetic energy being lost to rotational kinetic energy, plastic deformation, and heat. It can be more than 1 if there is an energy gain during the collision from a chemical reaction, a reduction in rotational energy, or another internal energy decrease that contributes to the post-collision velocity.

The mathematics were developed by Sir Isaac Newton in 1687. It is also known as Newton's experimental law.

Further details 

Line of impact – It is the line along which e is defined or in absence of tangential reaction force between colliding surfaces, force of impact is shared along this line between bodies. During physical contact between bodies during impact its line along common normal to pair of surfaces in contact of colliding bodies. Hence e is defined as a dimensionless one-dimensional parameter.

Range of values for e – treated as a constant 

e is usually a positive, real number between 0 and 1:

e = 0: This is a perfectly inelastic collision.
0 < e < 1: This is a real-world inelastic collision, in which some kinetic energy is dissipated.
e = 1: This is a perfectly elastic collision, in which no kinetic energy is dissipated, and the objects rebound from one another with the same relative speed with which they approached.e < 0: A COR less than zero would represent a collision in which the separation velocity of the objects has the same direction (sign) as the closing velocity, implying the objects passed through one another without fully engaging. This may also be thought of as an incomplete transfer of momentum. An example of this might be a small, dense object passing through a large, less dense one – e.g., a bullet passing through a target.e'' > 1: This would represent a collision in which energy is released, for example, nitrocellulose billiard balls can literally explode at the point of impact.  Also, some recent articles have described superelastic collisions in which it is argued that the COR can take a value greater than one in a special case of oblique collisions. These phenomena are due to the change of rebound trajectory caused by friction. In such collisions kinetic energy is released in some sort of explosion.  It is possible that  for a perfect explosion of a rigid system.

 Paired objects 

The COR is a property of a pair of objects in a collision, not a single object. If a given object collides with two different objects, each collision would have its own COR. When an object is described as having a coefficient of restitution, as if it were an intrinsic property without reference to a second object, it is assumed to be between identical spheres or against a perfectly rigid wall.

A perfectly rigid wall is not possible but can be approximated by a steel block if investigating the COR of spheres with a much smaller modulus of elasticity.  Otherwise, the COR will rise and then fall based on collision velocity in a more complicated manner.

 Relationship with conservation of energy and momentum 

In a one-dimensional collision, the two key principles are: conservation of energy (conservation of kinetic energy if the collision is perfectly elastic) and conservation of (linear) momentum. A third equation can be derived from these two, which is the restitution equation as stated above. When solving problems, any two of the three equations can be used. The advantage of using the restitution equation is that it sometimes provides a more convenient way to approach the problem.

Let ,  be the mass of object 1 and object 2 respectively. Let ,  be the initial velocity of object 1 and object 2 respectively. Let ,  be the final velocity of object 1 and object 2 respectively.

From the first equation,

From the second equation,

After division,

The equation above is the restitution equation, and the coefficient of restitution is 1, which is a perfectly elastic collision.

Sports equipment

Thin-faced golf club drivers utilize a "trampoline effect" that creates drives of a greater distance as a result of the flexing and subsequent release of stored energy which imparts greater impulse to the ball.  The USGA (America's governing golfing body) tests drivers for COR and has placed the upper limit at 0.83. COR is a function of rates of clubhead speeds and diminish as clubhead speed increase. In the report COR ranges from 0.845 for 90 mph to as low as 0.797 at 130 mph. The above-mentioned "trampoline effect" shows this since it reduces the rate of stress of the collision by increasing the time of the collision.  According to one article (addressing COR in tennis racquets), "[f]or the Benchmark Conditions, the coefficient of restitution used is 0.85 for all racquets, eliminating the variables of string tension and frame stiffness which could add or subtract from the coefficient of restitution."

The International Table Tennis Federation specifies that the ball shall bounce up 24–26 cm when dropped from a height of 30.5 cm on to a standard steel block thereby having a COR of 0.887 to 0.923.

A basketball's COR is designated by requiring that the ball shall rebound to a height of between 960 and 1160 mm when dropped from a height of 1800 mm, resulting in a COR between 0.73–0.80.

 Equations 
In the case of a one-dimensional collision involving two objects, object A and object B, the coefficient of restitution is given by:

 where:
 is the final speed of object A after impact
 is the final speed of object B after impact
 is the initial speed of object A before impact
 is the initial speed of object B before impact

Though  does not explicitly depend on the masses of the objects, it is important to note that the final velocities are mass-dependent. For two- and three-dimensional collisions of rigid bodies, the velocities used are the components perpendicular to the tangent line/plane at the point of contact, i.e. along the line of impact.

For an object bouncing off a stationary target,  is defined as the ratio of the object's speed after the impact to that prior to impact:

 where
 is the speed of the object after impact
 is the speed of the object before impact

In a case where frictional forces can be neglected and the object is dropped from rest onto a horizontal surface, this is equivalent to:

 where
 is the bounce height
 is the drop height

The coefficient of restitution can be thought of as a measure of the extent to which mechanical energy is conserved when an object bounces off a surface. In the case of an object bouncing off a stationary target, the change in gravitational potential energy, Ep, during the course of the impact is essentially zero; thus,  is a comparison between the kinetic energy, Ek, of the object immediately before impact with that immediately after impact:

In a cases where frictional forces can be neglected (nearly every student laboratory on this subject), and the object is dropped from rest onto a horizontal surface, the above is equivalent to a comparison between the Ep of the object at the drop height with that at the bounce height. In this case, the change in Ek is zero (the object is essentially at rest during the course of the impact and is also at rest at the apex of the bounce); thus:

 Speeds after impact 
The equations for collisions between elastic particles can be modified to use the COR, thus becoming applicable to inelastic collisions, as well, and every possibility in between.

and

where
 is the final velocity of the first object after impact
 is the final velocity of the second object after impact
 is the initial velocity of the first object before impact
 is the initial velocity of the second object before impact
 is the mass of the first object
 is the mass of the second object

 Derivation 
The above equations can be derived from the analytical solution to the system of equations formed by the definition of the COR and the law of the conservation of momentum (which holds for all collisions). Using the notation from above where  represents the velocity before the collision and  after, yields:

 COR variation due to object shape and off-center collisions 
When colliding objects do not have a direction of motion that is in-line with their centers of gravity and point of impact, or if their contact surfaces at that point are not perpendicular to that line, some energy that would have been available for the post-collision velocity difference will be lost to rotation and friction. Energy losses to vibration and the resulting sound are usually negligible.

 Colliding different materials and practical measurement 
When a soft object strikes a harder object, most of the energy available for the post-collision velocity will be stored in the soft object. The COR will depend on how efficient the soft object is at storing the energy in compression without losing it to heat and plastic deformation. A rubber ball will bounce better off concrete than a glass ball, but the COR of glass-on-glass is a lot higher than rubber-on-rubber because some of the energy in rubber is lost to heat when it is compressed.  When a rubber ball collides with a glass ball, the COR will depend entirely on the rubber. For this reason, determining the COR of a material when there is not identical material for collision is best done by using a much harder material.

Since there is no perfectly rigid material, hard materials such as metals and ceramics have their COR theoretically determined by considering the collision between identical spheres. In practice, a 2-ball Newton's cradle may be employed but such a set up is not conducive to quickly testing samples.

The Leeb rebound hardness test is the only commonly-available test related to determining the COR.  It uses a tip of tungsten carbide, one of the hardest substances available, dropped onto test samples from a specific height. But the shape of the tip, the velocity of impact, and the tungsten carbide are all variables that affect the result that is expressed in terms of 1000*COR. It does not give an objective COR for the material that is independent from the test.

A comprehensive study of coefficients of restitution in dependence on material properties (elastic moduli, rheology), direction of impact, coefficient of friction and adhesive properties of impacting bodies can be found in Willert (2020).

 Predicting from material properties 
The COR is not a material property because it changes with the shape of the material and the specifics of the collision, but it can be predicted from material properties and the velocity of impact when the specifics of the collision are simplified.  To avoid the complications of rotational and frictional losses, we can consider the ideal case of an identical pair of spherical objects, colliding so that their centers of mass and relative velocity are all in-line.

Many materials like metals and ceramics (but not rubbers and plastics) are assumed to be perfectly elastic when their yield strength is not approached during impact. The impact energy is theoretically stored only in the spring-effect of elastic compression and results in e = 1. But this applies only at velocities less than about 0.1 m/s to 1 m/s. The elastic range can be exceeded at higher velocities because all the kinetic energy is concentrated at the point of impact. Specifically, the yield strength is usually exceeded in part of the contact area, losing energy to plastic deformation by not remaining in the elastic region. To account for this, the following estimates the COR by estimating the percent of the initial impact energy that did not get lost to plastic deformation.  Approximately, it divides how easily a volume of the material can store energy in compression by how well it can stay in the elastic range:

For a given material density and velocity this results in:

A high yield strength allows more of the "contact volume" of the material to stay in the elastic region at higher energies.  A lower elastic modulus allows a larger contact area to develop during impact so the energy is distributed to a larger volume beneath the surface at the contact point. This helps prevent the yield strength from being exceeded.

A more precise theoretical development shows the velocity and density of the material to also be important when predicting the COR at moderate velocities faster than elastic collision (greater than 0.1 m/s for metals) and slower than large permanent plastic deformation (less than 100 m/s). A lower velocity increases the coefficient by needing less energy to be absorbed. A lower density also means less initial energy needs to be absorbed. The density instead of mass is used because the volume of the sphere cancels out with the volume of the affected volume at the contact area. In this way, the radius of the sphere does not affect the coefficient.  A pair of colliding spheres of different sizes but of the same material have the same coefficient as below, but multiplied by 

Combining these four variables, a theoretical estimation of the coefficient of restitution can be made when a ball is dropped onto a surface of the same material.

 e = coefficient of restitution
 Sy = dynamic yield strength (dynamic "elastic limit")
 E′ = effective elastic modulus
 ρρ = density
 v = velocity at impact
 μ = Poisson's ratio

This equation overestimates the actual COR. For metals, it applies when v is approximately between 0.1 m/s and 100 m/s and in general when:

At slower velocities the COR is higher than the above equation predicts, theoretically reaching e=1 when the above fraction is less than  m/s.  It gives the following theoretical coefficient of restitution for solid spheres dropped 1 meter (v'' = 4.5 m/s). Values greater than 1 indicate that the equation has errors. Yield strength instead of dynamic yield strength was used.

The COR for plastics and rubbers are greater than their actual values because they do not behave as ideally elastic as metals, glasses, and ceramics due to heating during compression.  So the following is only a guide to ranking of polymers.

Polymers (overestimated compared to metals and ceramics):

 polybutadiene (golf balls shell)
 butyl rubber
 EVA
 silicone elastomers
 polycarbonate
 nylon
 polyethylene
 Teflon
 polypropylene
 ABS
 acrylic
 PET
 polystyrene
 PVC

For metals the range of speeds to which this theory can apply is about 0.1 to 5 m/s which is a drop of 0.5 mm to 1.25 meters (page 366).

See also 
 Bouncing ball
 Collision
 Damping capacity
 Resilience

References 

Works cited

External links 
 Wolfram Article on COR
 
 Chris Hecker's physics introduction
 "Getting an extra bounce" by Chelsea Wald
 FIFA Quality Concepts for Footballs – Uniform Rebound
 

Mechanics
Classical mechanics
Ratios

de:Stoß (Physik)#Realer Stoß